East Fishkill is a town on the southern border of Dutchess County, New York, United States. The population was 29,707 at the 2020 census. The town was once the eastern portion of the town of Fishkill.

Hudson Valley Research Park is located in the town. The site once  known as IBM East Fishkill, once housed 27 divisions and 4,700 regular employees for IBM Microelectronics, which later became a part of GlobalFoundries. IBM produced microchips at this facility and it also house the advanced, automated processor fabrication facility where IBM's "Cell" processor was co-developed. The fab's current owner is Onsemi.

History

The Wiccopee, a sub-tribe of the Wappinger Native Americans, once lived in what is now the East Fishkill hamlet of Wiccopee. One early European settler arrived around 1759. 

Platt Rogers Spencer, the inventor of the leading U.S. business-handwriting style of the 19th Century, was born in the area in 1800.

The town of East Fishkill was established in 1849 from the eastern part of the town of Fishkill. Its name comes from Fishkill Creek, known as the Vis Kille (Fish Creek) to the Dutch settlers in the area.

Geography

East Fishkill is bordered on the west by Fishkill and Wappinger, on the north by LaGrange, and on the east by Beekman and Pawling. The southern town line borders Philipstown and Kent, both of which are part of Putnam County.

Interstate 84 and the Appalachian Trail pass across the town. The Taconic State Parkway runs north–south as well.

Demographics

As of the census of 2000, there were 25,589 people, 8,233 households, and 7,006 families residing in the town.  The population density was 449.7 people per square mile (173.6/km2).  There were 8,495 housing units at an average density of 149.3 per square mile (57.6/km2).  The racial makeup of the town was 92.54% white, 2.29% African American, .15% Native American, 2.8% Asian, 0.02% Pacific Islander, .86% from other races, and 1.34% from two or more races. Hispanic or Latino of any race were 4.04% of the population.

There were 8,233 households, out of which 45.8% had children under the age of 18 living with them, 75.7% were married couples living together, 6.5% had a female householder with no husband present, and 14.9% were non-families. Of all households 11.9% were made up of individuals, and 3.9% had someone living alone who was 65 years of age or older.  The average household size was 3.10 and the average family size was 3.38.

In the town, the population was spread out, with 29.7% under the age of 18, 6.4% from 18 to 24, 30.4% from 25 to 44, 25.5% from 45 to 64, and 8.0% who were 65 years of age or older.  The median age was 37 years. For every 100 females, there were 98.9 males.  For every 100 females age 18 and over, there were 96.9 males.

The mean income for a household in the town was $116,059, and the mean income for a family was $129,660. Males had a median income of $59,735 versus $35,014 for females. The per capita income for the town was $28,553.  About 1.5% of families and 2.8% of the population were below the poverty line, including 2.7% of those under age 18 and 3.7% of those age 65 or over.

Locations

 Fishkill Plains – A hamlet in the northwestern part of the town.
 Gayhead – A location just outside of Hopewell Junction.
 Hillside Lake – A location northeast of Fishkill Plains.
 Hopewell Junction – A hamlet in the northwestern part of the town.
 Hortontown – A hamlet in the eastern section of town.
 Leetown - An area on top of Stormville Mountain, named after early settlers. 
 Lomala – A hamlet south of Hopewell Junction.
 Pecksville – A hamlet in the southeastern corner of the town.
 Shenandoah Corners – A hamlet in the southern part of the town.
 Stormville – A hamlet in the eastern part of the town named after early settlers, brothers Jacob and Rupert Storm.
  (was  –1904) – A hamlet near the western town line. It includes the area of Fishkill Hook.

See also

References

External links

 Town of East Fishkill official website
 East Fishkill Historical Society
 "Historic Hopewell Junction" video (includes East Fishkill)
 East Fishkill Community Library

Towns in Dutchess County, New York
Dutchess
1849 establishments in New York (state)
Populated places established in 1849